KTBZ (1430 kHz, "1430 the Buzz") is a commercial AM radio station in Tulsa, Oklahoma.  It airs a sports radio format and is owned by iHeartMedia, Inc., with the license held by iHM Licenses, LLC.  On weekdays, Oklahoma-based hosts are heard in mornings, middays and afternoons, some shared with co-owned 94.7 KREF-FM in Oklahoma City.  For evenings, nights and weekends, CBS Sports Radio is heard.  KTBZ's studios are at the Tulsa Event Center, on Yale Avenue in Southeast Tulsa.

By day, KTBZ is powered at 25,000 watts.  But at night, to protect other stations on 1430 AM from interference, it reduces power to 5,000 watts.  It uses a directional antenna with a three-tower array.  The transmitter site is on East 56th Street North at North Lewis Avenue in Turley.

History

CBS Radio and MOR
The original call sign was KTUL, which stood for TULsa. It was heard on 1400 kilocycles, but moved to 1430 with the 1941 enactment of the North American Regional Broadcasting Agreement (NARBA). KTUL was Tulsa's second radio station, after KVOO. It was a CBS Radio Network affiliate. KTUL carried CBS's schedule of dramas, comedies, news, sports, soap operas, game shows and big band broadcasts during the "Golden Age of Radio." One of its early local stars, with a regular live music program, was a young teen-aged Patti Page.

In the 1950s, network programming moved from radio to television.  So KTUL switched to a full service, Middle of the Road (MOR) format of popular adult music, news and sports.

Top 40 KELi
In the fall of 1961, the station was bought by new owners.  It switched to a Top 40 hits format and the call letters were changed to KELi (with the little "i" in the station logo). 

During the 1960s, KELi became famous for having a disc jockey and news staff all with the last name of "Kelly". The station broadcast from the "Satellite Studios" in the middle of the Tulsa State Fairgrounds until the station moved in 1982. The station had studio tours and did many promotions during the Tulsa State Fair. KELi's Top 40 format lasted for 20 years, outlasting rival KAKC 970 AM, which switched to MOR and adult standards in 1979. 

Since the early 1980s, 1430 has aired a talk radio format, contemporary hits (as the short-lived "14-K / 92-K" in 1983-84), oldies, adult contemporary and classic country.

Sports Radio The Buzz
The station was assigned the KTBZ call letters by the Federal Communications Commission on June 5, 2001.  It flipped to a sports talk station as "AM 1430 The Buzz."  Originally it was a Fox Sports Radio affiliate.  It carries live games from the Oklahoma Sooners, Tulsa Drillers and the Dallas Cowboys.  In Tulsa, co-owned AM 1430 and AM 1300 had combined to form the Buzz Sports Network. 

In 2021, KFAQ 1170 AM in Tulsa, switched to a sports format, as KTSB "The Blitz."  It took the Fox Sports Radio affiliation, with KTBZ switching to CBS Sports Radio.  Co-owned KAKC 1300 AM flipped to talk radio programming as "The Patriot."

References

External links
KTBZ official website
Tulsa TV Memories site on KELi

TBZ
Sports radio stations in the United States
Radio stations established in 1961
IHeartMedia radio stations